Mount Erlang is a mountain in Sichuan province, China.

Located 50 kilometers west of Tianquan County, Sichuan, at an altitude of 3437 meters, and 172 kilometers away from Chengdu, it is the watershed of Qingyi River and Dadu River, which is the boundary of natural geography.

The Mount Erlang Tunnel is a road tunnel that was dug through Mount Erlang.

References

Erlang